Daesiidae is a family of solifugids, which are widespread in Africa and the Middle East. Members of the family are also present in India, Italy, South America, the Balkans, and the single species Gluvia dorsalis in the Iberian Peninsula. A single fossil species is known from Eocene Baltic amber.

Genera
, the World Solifugae Catalog accepts the following twenty-nine genera:

Ammotrechelis Roewer, 1934
Biton Karsch, 1880
Bitonota Roewer, 1933
Bitonupa Roewer, 1933
Blossia Simon, 1880
Blossiana Roewer, 1933
Ceratobiton Delle Cave & Simonetta, 1971
Daesiola Roewer, 1933
Eberlanzia Roewer, 1941
Gluvia C.L. Koch, 1842
Gluviella Caporiacco, 1948
Gluviola Roewer, 1933
Gluviopsida Roewer, 1933
Gluviopsilla Roewer, 1933
Gluviopsis Kraepelin, 1899
Gluviopsona Roewer, 1933
Gnosippus Karsch, 1880
Haarlovina Lawrence, 1956
Hemiblossia Kraepelin, 1899
Hemiblossiola Roewer, 1933
Hodeidania Roewer, 1933
Mumaella Harvey, 2002
Namibesia Lawrence, 1962
Syndaesia Maury, 1980
Tarabulida Roewer, 1933
Triditarsula Roewer, 1933
Triditarsus Roewer, 1933
Valdesia Maury, 1981
†Palaeoblossia Dunlop, Wunderlich & Poinar, 2004

References

Solifugae
Arachnids of Africa
Arachnid families